Shankarpalli mandal is one of the 27 mandals in Ranga Reddy district of the Indian state of Telangana. It is under the administration of Chevella revenue division and has its headquarters at Shankarpalli.

Government

Administration 
The mandal is headed by a tahsildar.  census, the mandal has thirteen villages with one town.

The settlements in the mandal are listed below:

See also 
 List of mandals in Telangana

References 

Mandals in Ranga Reddy district